Thakuri dynasty was a Hindu dynasty that mostly ruled the present-day Nuwakot, near central Nepal. The Thakuri dynasty's existence is disputed by some historians. Suspected of originally having been merchants, this dynasty is also known as Vaishya Thakuri.

Thakuri kings
The Thakuri dynasty were  Khas Chettri. After Aramudi, who is mentioned in the Kashmirian chronicle, the Rajatarangini of Kalhana (1150 CE), many Thakuri kings ruled over parts of the country up to the middle of the 12th century CE. Raghava Deva is said to have founded a ruling dynasty in 879 CE, when the Lichhavi rule came to an end. To commemorate this important event, Raghava Deva started the 'Nepal Era' which began on 20 October, 879 CE. After Amshuvarma, who ruled from 605 CE onward; the Thakuris had lost power and they could regain it only in 869 CE.

Gunakamadeva

After the death of King Raghava Dev, many Thakuri kings ruled southern Nepal up to the middle of the 12th century CE. Gunakama Deva, who ruled from 949 to 994 CE, commissioned the construction of a big wooden shelter, built from the wood of a single tree, called Kasthamandapa. The name of the capital, 'Kathmandu', is derived from this. Gunakama Deva founded the town Kantipur (modern-day Kathmandu). The tradition of Indra Jatra started during his reign. Temples to the north of the temple of Pashupatinath were renovated in this period.

Successors of Gunakama Dev
Bhola Deva succeeded Gunakama Deva. The next ruler was Laxmikama Deva who ruled from 1024 to 1040 CE. He built the Laksmi Vihara and introduced the tradition of worshiping the Kumari; young prepubescent girls believed to be manifestations of the divine female energy or devi. He was succeeded by his son, Vijayakama Deva, who introduced the worship of the Naga and Vasuki. Vijaykama Deva was the last ruler of this dynasty. After his death, the Thakuri clan of Nuwakot occupied the throne of Nepal.

Nuwakot Thakuri Kings
Bhaskara Deva, a Thakuri from Nuwakot, succeeded Vijayakama Deva and established the Nuwakot-Thakuri rule. He is said to have built Navabahal and Hemavarna Vihara. After Bhaskara Deva, four kings of this line ruled over the country. They were Bala Deva, Padma Deva, Nagarjuna Deva and Shankara Deva.

Shankara Deva (1067–1080 CE) was the most illustrious ruler of this dynasty. He established the image of 'Shantesvara Mahadeva' and 'Manohara Bhagavati'. The custom of pasting the pictures of Nagas and Vasuki on the doors of houses on the day of Nagapanchami was introduced by him. During his rule, the Buddhists wreaked vengeance on the Hindu Brahmins (especially the followers of Shaivism) for the harm they had received earlier from the Shankaracharya. Shankara Deva tried to pacify the Brahmins harassed by the Buddhists.

Suryavansi (the Solar Dynasty)
Bama Deva, a descendant of Amshuvarma, defeated Shankar Deva in 1080 CE. He suppressed the Nuwakot-Thankuris with the help of nobles and restored the old Solar Dynasty rule in Nepal for the second time. Harsha Deva, the successor of Bama Deva was a weak ruler. There was no unity among the nobles and they asserted themselves in their respective spheres of influence. Taking that opportunity Nanya Deva, a Karnat dynasty king, attacked Nuwakot from Simraungarh. The army successfully defended and won the battle.

Shivadeva III
After Harsha Deva, Shivadeva the third ruled from 1099 to 1126 CE.  He was a brave and powerful king.  He founded the town of Kirtipur and roofed the temple of Pashupatinath with gold.  He introduced twenty-five paisa coins. He also constructed wells, canals, and tanks at different places.

After Sivadeva III, Mahendra Deva, Mana Deva, Narendra Deva II, Ananda Deva, Rudra Deva, Amrita Deva, Ratna Deva II, Somesvara Deva, Gunakama Deva II, Lakmikama Deva III and Vijayakama Deva II ruled Nepal in quick succession.  Historians differ about the rule of several kings and their respective times. After the fall of the Thakuri dynasty, a new dynasty was founded by Arideva or Ari Malla, known as the 'Malla dynasty'.

References

Citations

Bibliography 

 
 

6th-century establishments in Nepal
12th-century disestablishments in Nepal
Ancient Nepal
Dynasties of Nepal